The Phoenix Roadrunners were a professional ice hockey team in the World Hockey Association (WHA) from 1974 to 1977. They played at Arizona Veterans Memorial Coliseum in Phoenix, Arizona. The organization folded for financial reasons before the remaining teams in the WHA merged with the NHL in 1979. The colors of the team were blue and gold.

In 1996 the Winnipeg Jets, a former WHA franchise, moved to Phoenix and became the Phoenix Coyotes (now the Arizona Coyotes).  In 2016, the Coyotes purchased their AHL affiliate (the Springfield Falcons), and moved them to Tucson. The Tucson Roadrunners use a logo very similar to the WHA Roadrunners.

History

The franchise originally competed in the Western Hockey League (WHL) from 1967 to 1974 after being moved from Victoria, British Columbia, where they had played for the three previous seasons as the Maple Leafs.

In 1974, the Roadrunners joined the WHA with their roster mostly intact when the WHL ceased operations.  The Roadrunners achieved relative success during their first two WHA seasons, but lack of financial success resulted in the removal of local favorite Sandy Hucul as coach and his replacement with Al Rollins, who was disliked by Phoenix hockey fans. Rollins did not succeed in improving the team's fortunes.  At one point, the team was forced to sell players just to pay the bills.  The Roadrunners finally gave up and folded at the end of its third season.
The last active WHA Roadrunner in major professional hockey was the team's star player, Robbie Ftorek, who retired from the NHL after the 1984–85 season.

Notable players
Robbie Ftorek – (WHA MVP 1977)

Season-by-season record
Note: GP = Games played, W = Wins, L = Losses, T = Ties, Pts = Points, GF = Goals for, GA = Goals against, PIM = Penalties in minutes

See also
 List of Phoenix Roadrunners (WHA) players

External links
 Phoenix Roadrunners 1974–1977
 Team History at Hockeydb.com

Defunct ice hockey teams in the United States
  
Sports in Phoenix, Arizona
World Hockey Association teams
Ice hockey clubs established in 1974
Ice hockey clubs disestablished in 1977
Ice hockey teams in Arizona
1974 establishments in Arizona
1977 disestablishments in Arizona